Incarnate Word Academy is a Roman Catholic, private, secondary school for women. The school is sponsored by the Congregation of the Sisters of Charity of the Incarnate Word.  The school is located in Bel-Nor, a suburb of St. Louis, in the Roman Catholic Archdiocese of Saint Louis.

History
In 1932, the Sisters of Charity of the Incarnate Word opened the all-girls high school in response to a need for the education of young women.  The first year, the school enrolled thirty-five students.  Three additional buildings and seventy-five years later, the school is now home to about five hundred students.

Athletics
Cheerleading, soccer, volleyball, and basketball are sports in which the school has won state championships.  The school also offers a variety of sports including softball, tennis, golf, cross country, track, dance, and swimming. The Red Knights' most recent state championship title was at the 2021 Missouri State High School Basketball Championship game against Webster Groves on March 20, 2021, at the JQH Arena in Springfield, Missouri. They won with a score of 58-37 bringing the school their fourth state championship title in a decade.

References

External links
  Incarnate Word Academy School Home Page

Roman Catholic Archdiocese of St. Louis
Roman Catholic secondary schools in St. Louis County, Missouri
Educational institutions established in 1932
Girls' schools in Missouri
1932 establishments in Missouri